United Nations General Assembly Resolution 68/262 was adopted on 27 March 2014 by the sixty-eighth session of the United Nations General Assembly in response to the Russian annexation of Crimea and entitled "territorial integrity of Ukraine". The nonbinding resolution, which was supported by 100 United Nations member states, affirmed the General Assembly's commitment to the territorial integrity of Ukraine within its internationally recognized borders and underscored the invalidity of the 2014 Crimean referendum. Eleven nations voted against the resolution, while 58 abstained, and a further 24 states were absent when the vote took place. 

The resolution was introduced by Canada, Costa Rica, Germany, Lithuania, Poland, and Ukraine. The adoption of the resolution was preceded by the unsuccessful attempts of the United Nations Security Council, which convened seven sessions to address the Crimean crisis, only to face a Russian veto of draft resolution S/2014/189, sponsored by 42 countries.

Voting rationales 
Nicos Emiliou, permanent representative of Cyprus to the United Nations, who favoured the resolution, said that "Cyprus underlines the importance of respecting the fundamental principles of sovereignty, territorial integrity and independence of all states, including Ukraine". Emiliou urged to conduct a probe on all acts of violence and encouraged Russia to engage in a diplomatic solution.

The permanent representative of China to the United Nations, Liu Jieyi, whose country abstained from voting, stated that "in the context of the ongoing diplomatic mediation efforts by the parties concerned, an attempt to push ahead with the UNGA vote on the draft resolution on the question of Ukraine will only further complicate the situation".

Russian reaction 
On 28 March 2014, the Russian Federation stated that the resolution was counterproductive and accused Western states of using blackmail and threats to drum up approval votes.

Voting

Related resolutions 
 Res. 71/205, 19 December 2016, "Situation of human rights in the Autonomous Republic of Crimea and the city of Sevastopol (Ukraine)."
Res. 72/190, 19 December 2017, "Situation of human rights in the Autonomous Republic of Crimea and the city of Sevastopol, Ukraine."
 Res. 73/194, 17 December 2018, "Problem of the militarization of the Autonomous Republic of Crimea and the city of Sevastopol, Ukraine, as well as parts of the Black Sea and the Sea of Azov."
 Res. 73/263, 22 December 2018, "Situation of human rights in the Autonomous Republic of Crimea and the city of Sevastopol, Ukraine."
 Res. 74/17, 9 December 2019, "Problem of the militarization of the Autonomous Republic of Crimea and the city of Sevastopol, Ukraine, as well as parts of the Black Sea and the Sea of Azov."
Res. 74/168, 18 December 2019, "Situation of human rights in the Autonomous Republic of Crimea and the city of Sevastopol, Ukraine."
Res. 75/29, 7 December 2020, "Problem of the militarization of the Autonomous Republic of Crimea and the city of Sevastopol, Ukraine, as well as parts of the Black Sea and the Sea of Azov."
Res. 75/192, 16 December 2020, "Situation of human rights in the Autonomous Republic of Crimea  and the city of Sevastopol, Ukraine."
Res. 76/70, 9 December 2021, "Problem of the militarization of the Autonomous Republic of Crimea and the city of Sevastopol, Ukraine, as well as parts of the Black Sea and the Sea of Azov"
Res. 76/179, 16 December 2021, "Situation of human rights in the temporarily occupied Autonomous Republic of Crimea and the city of Sevastopol, Ukraine"

See also 
 2021–2022 Russo-Ukrainian crisis
 2022 Russian invasion of Ukraine
 Eleventh emergency special session of the United Nations General Assembly:
 ES-11/1: "Aggression against Ukraine"
 ES-11/2: "Humanitarian consequences of the aggression against Ukraine"
 ES-11/3: "Suspension of the rights of membership of the Russian Federation in the Human Rights Council"
 ES-11/4: "Territorial integrity of Ukraine"
 ES-11/5: "Furtherance of remedy and reparation for aggression against Ukraine"
 Legality of the 2022 Russian invasion of Ukraine
 United Nations Security Council Resolution 2623

References

External links
 United Nations General Assembly Resolution 68/262 on wikisource.org

2014 in the United Nations
2014 in law
Annexation of Crimea by the Russian Federation
Foreign relations of Ukraine
United Nations General Assembly resolutions
2014 in Ukraine
2014 in Russia
March 2014 events
Russia and the United Nations
Ukraine and the United Nations